Forcing may refer to:

Mathematics and science
Forcing (mathematics), a technique for obtaining independence proofs for set theory
Forcing (recursion theory), a modification of Paul Cohen's original set theoretic technique of forcing to deal with the effective concerns in recursion theory
Forcing, driving a harmonic oscillator at a particular frequency
Cloud forcing, the difference between the radiation budget components for average cloud conditions and cloud-free conditions
 Forcing bulbs, the inducement of plants to flower earlier than their natural season
Radiative forcing, the difference between the incoming radiation energy and the outgoing radiation energy in a given climate system

Arts, entertainment, and media
Forcing (magic), a technique by which a magician forces one outcome from a card draw
 Forcing, several distinct concepts within the game of contract bridge:
 Forcing bid
 Forcing defense
 Forcing notrump
 Forcing pass
 Forcing take-out, an obsolete name for a strong jump shift; see Glossary of contract bridge terms#forcingtakeout
 Fourth suit forcing

See also
Force (disambiguation)